Nigrosporin B is a naphthoquinone isolate of the fungus Nigrospora. Nigrosporin B has anti-mycobacterial activity.

Notes 

Phenol ethers
Trihydroxyanthraquinones
Methoxy compounds